Didier Gopaul (born October 8, 1983) is a Mauritian football player who currently plays for Étoile de l'Ouest Bambous in the Mauritian Premier League and for the Mauritius national football team as a goalkeeper. He is featured on the Mauritian national team in the official 2010 FIFA World Cup video game.

References 

1983 births
Living people
Mauritius international footballers
Mauritian footballers
Association football goalkeepers